Heteroclytomorpha is a genus of longhorn beetles of the subfamily Lamiinae, containing the following species:

 Heteroclytomorpha inaequalis Aurivillius, 1908
 Heteroclytomorpha punctata Gahan, 1888
 Heteroclytomorpha quadrinotata Blanchard, 1853
 Heteroclytomorpha sexplagiata Breuning, 1939
 Heteroclytomorpha simplex Lacordaire, 1872
 Heteroclytomorpha singularis Breuning, 1950
 Heteroclytomorpha sormeoides Aurivillius, 1908

References

Homonoeini